This partial list of city nicknames in Louisiana compiles the aliases, sobriquets and slogans that cities in Louisiana are known by (or have been known by historically), officially and unofficially, to municipal governments, local people, outsiders or their tourism boards or chambers of commerce. City nicknames can help in establishing a civic identity, helping outsiders recognize a community or attracting people to a community because of its nickname; promote civic pride; and build community unity. Nicknames and slogans that successfully create a new community "ideology or myth" are also believed to have economic value. Their economic value is difficult to measure, but there are anecdotal reports of cities that have achieved substantial economic benefits by "branding" themselves by adopting new slogans.

Some unofficial nicknames are positive, while others are derisive. The unofficial nicknames listed here have been in use for a long time or have gained wide currency.
Baton Rouge –  Big Raggedy
Breaux Bridge – Crayfish Capital of the World or Crawfish Capital of the World (In Louisiana vernacular, "Crawfish" would be the correct way to say it.)Breaux Bridge, Louisiana, Chamber of Commerce website, accessed July 3, 2008
Des Allemands – Catfish Capital of the World
Dubach – Dogtrot Capital of the World
Gonzales – Jambalaya Capital of the WorldClaims to Fame - Food , Epodunk, accessed April 16, 2007.
Gueydan – Duck Capital of America
Jennings – Cradle of Louisiana Oil
Lake Charles - The Chuck
Lafayette
The Heart of Acadiana
The Flats
Lecompte – Pie Capital of Louisiana
New Orleans
America's Favorite City
America's Most Interesting City
America’s Most European City
America's European Masterpiece
The Big Easy''U.S. City Monikers, Tagline Guru website, accessed January 5, 2008
Birthplace of Jazz
City of the Chefs
City of Festivals
City of Mystery
The City that Care ForgotNew Orleans—"The City That Care Forgot" and Other Nicknames - A Preliminary Investigation 
The Crescent CityNew Orleans profile, accessed April 7, 2007. "Because it was built on a great turn of the river, it is known as the Crescent City."
Mardi Gras City
Nawlins
New York of the South
NOLA
Paris of the South
Queen City of the South
The Queen of the Mississippi
Saint City
Super Bowl City
Ponchatoula – Strawberry Capital of the World
Rayne – Frog Capital of the WorldClaims to Fame - Animals, Epodunk, accessed April 16, 2007.
Shreveport – Ratchet City
Slidell – The Camellia City (official), The Dell
St. Martinville – Birthplace of Acadiana

See also
 List of city nicknames in the United States

References

Louisiana cities and towns

City nicknames